Interview with a Hitman is a 2012 British action film written and directed by Perry Bhandal. The film tells the story of Viktor (Luke Goss), a professional Romanian hitman who agrees to tell his story to a disgraced film director desperate to discover a unique story that will help him rebuild his career. It was produced by Kirlian Pictures & Scanner Rhodes with the assistance of Northern Film & Media. The film stars Luke Goss, Caroline Tillette, Stephen Marcus, Danny Midwinter and Elliot Greene.

Plot
Viktor (Luke Goss) is a professional assassin. The film is told using flashbacks in which Viktor explains to a disgraced filmmaker how he became a professional assassin.

He starts his story with his childhood; he was raised in a slum area in an outlying district of Bucharest, Romania. He is being threatened by two young neighbourhood bullies, whom he owed money to, and Viktor's father is also being threatened by a local mafia. He, then and there, decides to take up a job with the local mafia, not to pay off his father's debt, but simply to escape his own fate. Sergei, the local mafia lieutenant takes him in after he proves his mettle. He returns home where he witnesses his father abusing his mother. Soon after; his father is assassinated even though he tries to pay off his debt to the local mafia, and the money and his cigarette lighter are returned to Victor's mother.

In his first assignment, Viktor is sent to collect money owed to the mafia but the man belittles the young lad and pays with his life. Victor kills the man's wife and was about to kill their two very young daughters when Sergei stops him and whisks him away. Viktor is moved to the city and is placed under the tutelage of Sergei, who teaches him how to be a hitman. In addition to preparation, eavesdropping, infiltration, and elimination, Sergei teaches him how to destroy a strong man by killing the people he cares for: "Sometimes, a simple bullet is not enough."

Working with Sergei until adulthood, they are assigned to work a drug purchase with Franco, the son of their boss Trafficant. Franco attempts to kill the man he is making a deal with, and Viktor and Sergei are forced to back him up, killing the drug vendor as well as his bodyguards. Unfortunately, the man they were making a deal with is the son of a well-known mafia boss, Vadim. Sergei and Viktor are tasked with covering up the murder, but have doubts about Trafficant's ability to keep the truth from coming out.

Viktor returns to his apartment, turning on the shower, and Sergei sneaks in to dispatch him. Viktor has been trained well, though, and takes Sergei prisoner, disarming him. They sit down and discuss how things had come to this point. It is clear that the two men have high regard for each other, but Sergei explains that he was compelled to kill Viktor by orders from Trafficant (even though he does not want to do it). He has no choice – either he can kill Viktor, or he himself will be killed. Only Viktor walks away. Knowing that the Romanian mafia will not rest until they believe him to be dead, Viktor puts in a body double in his place, and burns his apartment out.

Having thus faked his own death, he begins a new life in London by retrieving a wanted informant for a London mafia boss. Having proved his skill, he is next tasked with killing a British police officer who cannot be bought. This is accomplished by using liquid nicotine in the man's coffee at a coffee shop, which induces heart failure. After this success, he is invited to celebrate with the mafia boss and two women. They are attacked on their way to celebrate, and discover that the boss's lieutenant sold them out. He kills the lieutenant, and is invited to replace him, but declines. As a parting request, the boss asks him to kill a female reporter who is writing an article about him.

Viktor goes to a coffee shop, and some toughs come in and grab a woman inside and take her to the back of the shop to beat and rape her. He takes out the man guarding the entrance, and is about to leave, but the sound of the woman being beaten flashes back to his father beating his mother, so he has a change of heart and rescues her, finding out her name is Bethesda. He winds up meeting her again later, and they fall in love.

Six months later, he discovers that Bethesda is pregnant. After he finds out, he becomes very unsure of himself and almost kills her. He then tracks down the reporter and after he sees that she has a small child he shows her mercy and instead of killing her he tells her she is dead and needs to leave the country and start over somewhere else.

Viktor wants to turn over a new leaf and quit his job, but Romanian mafia comes back after him. His childhood friend Cesar has discovered that he is alive, and they try to kill him. Viktor takes Cesar prisoner, interviews him, and then kills him.

Returning home to Bucharest, Viktor finds that his mother died not long after he left to the city with Sergei, and that the two bullies who threatened him for money as a kid were now local mafia men doing the same thing as adults. A brief stop and two bullets later, Viktor pays a visit to Trafficant in a restaurant. They have a conversation about how Trafficant discovered that Viktor was alive (Viktor's old friend Alexei now works for Interpol, and relays information to Trafficant), why Trafficant sent men the second time, and how Trafficant convinced Sergei to attempt to murder Viktor years ago. After the conversation, Viktor shoots Trafficant and leaves the restaurant.

Viktor next pays a visit to Alexei, to discover his reasons for selling him out to Trafficant (and to kill him), but changes his mind upon noticing a picture of Alexei and his family. He orders Alexei to bury the video evidence of him being alive, and warns him that if he has to return, he will kill him.

Finally, the interview nears a conclusion. Bethesda arrives, and Viktor gives the man a ring – a ring that belongs to the interviewer's brother. Bethesda tells the story of two girls taken from their father and sold into service; one sister is weaker, and dies, but the other is stronger, and survives. Bethesda is that sister – she was used by the interviewer when she was only 10. The interview was a trap, to make him dream that he could have his film career back. Viktor shoots him.

Unsettled, Viktor sits down at Bethesda's invitation. She shoots him with the gun the interviewer had dropped, and explains why she went to the elaborate lengths she did to get to this point. It is revealed that Viktor killed Bethesda's parents when he first started his career as a hitman. She is the one who sold him out to Trafficant, who engineered the destruction of the interviewer, and ultimately, of Viktor himself. She tells him that the baby is a boy, and when the boy is old enough, she will show him the video of the interview so he can know what kind of man his father was, and despise him.

Cast

  Luke Goss as Viktor
  Caroline Tillette as Bethesda
  Stephen Marcus as Traffikant
  Elliot Greene as Young Viktor
  Branko Tomovic as Anatolie
  Philip Whitchurch as Tosca
  Danny Midwinter as Sergei
  Patrick Lyster as Xavier

Production

Interview with a Hitman was shot in 18 days in August 2011 on location in and around Newcastle upon Tyne, England and Bucharest, Romania. It is the debut feature of Perry Bhandal as writer and director.

Release
The film was released Theatrically on Friday, 20 July 2012 in Ireland and UK, and Kuwait in August 2012 and on UK DVD and Blu-ray 27 August 2012.

The film had its market premiere at the Cannes Film Festival in May 2012 and has gone on to sell in Major territories worldwide.

Interview with a Hitman was released in the US on 5 March 2013.

The film is also known as Hitman Reloaded (Australia), Entrevista com Hitman (Brazil), Synentefxi m' enan ektelesti (Greece), Wywiad z Hitmanem (Poland), Intervju sa Hitmenom (Serbia).

Critical reception

Oliver Hayes of The Fan Carpet said "Goss gives a scarily realistic performance as an assassin", and that the film "has a real independent film quality, subtle and restrained with some genuinely dark themes that underpin the narrative". He concludes that the film "is assured and competent in terms of its direction and a confident debut film from Bhandal." He gives the film 3 stars out of 5, summarizing, "Interview with a Hitman is a slick, accomplished movie from first time director Perry Bhandal, and based on the film one could easily see him stewarding a big budget Hollywood feature. As a return to British cinema, Goss has made a decent choice with IWAH and really lends some star power to the movie. I recommend people seek it out and watch the film, but you may not fancy a repeat viewing." 

It was given a rating of 44% by the review aggregator Rotten Tomatoes.

References

External links
  (Kirlian Pictures)
 

2012 films
2012 crime thriller films
British crime thriller films
British action films
2010s English-language films
Films set in London
Films set in Bucharest
2010s British films